Cham Kabud-e Olya (also Romanized as Cham Kabūd-e ‘Olyā; also known as Cham Kabūd-e Bālā) is a village in Kuhdasht-e Jonubi Rural District, in the Central District of Kuhdasht County, Lorestan Province, Iran. At the 2006 census, its population was 89, in 20 families.

References 

Towns and villages in Kuhdasht County